The Hutt is a public house located in the village of Ravenshead in Nottinghamshire, opposite Newstead Abbey. The pub was built on the site of The Royal Hutt in 1400 as part of the Newstead Estate, which was given to Sir John Byron in 1540.

History
Built on the site of the first building in Ravenshead, The Hutt was one of seven buildings constructed to allow the King's men to patrol the nearby forest. The Inn takes its name from the medieval spelling of the word 'Hut'.  The Inn boasts a tunnel that was reputedly used by monks to get from Newstead Abbey to The Hutt.  By the 17th century the pub had been turned into a coaching inn hosting merchants and travellers travelling between Nottingham and Mansfield. It is reported that at the inn they would take on some Dutch courage before setting off on the journey through 'Thieves Wood'.

References

Pubs in Nottinghamshire